The 2007 Giro del Trentino was the 31st edition of the Tour of the Alps cycle race and was held on 24 April to 27 April 2007. The race started and finished in Arco. The race was won by Damiano Cunego.

General classification

References

2007
2007 in road cycling
2007 in Italian sport